Geoffrey Breton (born 10 September 1984, Kingston upon Thames) is an English actor. He graduated from the Drama Centre London in 2006.

Select credits

Television
 Blue Murder (2003–09)
 The Rotters' Club (2005)
 The Old Curiosity Shop (2007)
 Chemical Wedding (2008)
 The Diary of Anne Frank (2008)
 Lewis (2009)
 Doctors (2010)
 Hollyoaks Later (2011)
 Inspector George Gently (2017)
 The Crown (2020)

Theatre
 Amy's View (2006)

Audio drama
 Absolution (2007)

Video games
 "Fable: the Journey"
 "The Witcher 3: The Wild Hunt"
 "Assassin's Creed: Valhalla"

External links

People from Kingston upon Thames
Living people
1984 births
English male stage actors
English male television actors